Noor Taher (born 2 November 1999) is a Jordanian actress of Palestinian and Lebanese descent, best known for her role as Layan Murad on the Netflix miniseries AIRawabi School for Girls.

Early biography
Noor Taher was born on 2 of November 1999 in Amman, Jordan, to a  Palestinian father and a Lebanese mother. She has one younger sister, Karam Taher, also an actress who stared in the movie Farha . Noor is classically trained in ballet. Her acting career began at age four. She was introduced to the film industry by her performing arts teacher, who was also a casting director at the time.

Career biography
Taher's first acting role was in The Stoning of Soraya M. in 2008. As the years followed, she focused on her education before taking up another acting role in the 2019 film Infidel. Her most notable role was in the 2021 Netflix miniseries, AlRawabi School for Girls, which premiered in 32 languages across 190 countries.

Credits
 The Stoning of Soraya M. (2008) (was credited as Noor Al Taher)
 The Shooting of Thomas Hurndall (2008) (was credited as Noor Al Taher)
 Infidel (2019)
 AlRawabi School for Girls (2021)

References

External links
 
 Watch AlRawabi School for Girls | Netflix Official Site

1999 births
Living people
Palestinian actresses
Palestinian women
Palestinian television actresses
Palestinian film actresses
Lebanese actresses
Lebanese women
Lebanese television actresses
Jordanian actresses
Jordanian models
Jordanian film actresses
Jordanian television actresses